Bashkortostan participated in the Turkvision Song Contest 2014 in Kazan, Tatarstan, Russia. The Bashkir entry was selected through a national final organised by Bashkir broadcaster Kuray Television (KTV). Zaman won the national final and went on to represent Bashkortostan in the contest, qualifying from the semi-final and finishing in third place in the grand final with the song "Kubair".

Background

Prior to the 2014 contest, Bashkortostan had participated once, in the inaugural  contest. Diana Ishniyazova represented Bashkortostan with the song "Kuray Şarkısı", but failed to qualify for the final.

Before Turkvision

National final
On 20 July 2014 it was announced that Bashkortostan would make their second appearance at the Turkvision Song Contest 2014 to be held in Kazan, Tatarstan in November 2014. On 9 October 2014 the Bashkir broadcaster made a call for submissions for the contest. A total of 10 submissions were received by the broadcaster for the contest, and 9 entries were selected to participate in the final on 30 October 2014. The final was won by Zaman with their song "Kubair".

The jury consisted of nine members:
Vakhit Khyzyrov
Svetlana Arginbayeva
Ural Idel'bayev
Vil'dan Yarullin
Robert Yuldashev
Boris Melkoyedov – Head of Press and Mass Media
Islam Bagirov – Co-ordinator of the Turkvision Song Contest 2014
Damir Davletshin – Director General of Tatarstani broadcaster Maidan TV
Aygul' Akhmadeyeva – CEO of KTV

Artist and song information

Zaman
Zaman is a Russian–Bashkortostani band. The band was formed in December 2013, consisting of eight members, who are graduates of the universities of Moscow and Bashkortostan, led by soloist Al'fiya Nigmatullina.

Discography

Kubair
"Kubair" is a song performed by Russian-Bashkortostani band Zaman, and written by Aydar Khamzin and Venera Nigmatullina. The song represented Bashkortostan in the Turkvision Song Contest 2014, placing 3rd with 199 points.

At Turkvision

Semi-final
Bashkortostan performed 17th in the semi-final on 19 November 2014, placing fourth in a field of 25 countries with 193 points, thus qualifying for the final.

Final
Bashkortostan performed sixth in the final on 21 November 2014, placing third in a field of 15 countries with 199 points.

Voting
The results were determined solely by jury voting. Each country was represented by one juror who gave each song, with the exception of their own country's song, between 1 and 10 points. The Bashkortostani juror was Aigul Akhmadeeva.

Points awarded to Bashkortostan

Points awarded by Bashkortostan

References

Turkvision
Turkvision
Countries in the Turkvision Song Contest 2014
2014